MV Argo Merchant  was a Liberian-flagged oil tanker built by Howaldtswerke in Hamburg, Germany, in 1953, most noted for running aground and subsequent sinking southeast of Nantucket Island, Massachusetts, causing one of the largest marine oil spills in history. Throughout the vessel's troubled past, she was involved in more than a dozen major shipping incidents including two other groundings; once in Indonesia while named Permina Samudra III, and again in Sicily while named Vari; and a collision in Japan.

Because of her checkered career and sinking, Argo Merchant was featured in the "worst ship" category in the 1979 publication, The Book of Heroic Failures.

1976 shipwreck

It was later established that the ship carried two unqualified crew as helmsmen, a broken gyrocompass, inadequate charts, and an inaccurate radio direction finder. The thirty-eight members of the crew were evacuated, but the shallow waters and weather conditions made it impossible to offload the oil or salvage the ship. On 21 December 1976, Argo Merchant broke apart and emptied its entire cargo of fuel oil, enough to heat 18,000 homes for a year. Northwesterly winds blew the  oil slick offshore, and coastal fisheries and beaches were spared the worst.

See also
 List of oil spills

References

Further reading
 
 
 

1953 ships
1976 in Massachusetts
Maritime incidents in 1976
History of Nantucket, Massachusetts
Oil spills in the United States
Oil tankers
Shipwrecks of the Massachusetts coast